Église Sainte-Marguerite de Carcheto-Brustico is a Roman Catholic church in Carcheto-Brustico, Haute-Corse, Corsica. The 17th-18th century building was classified as a Historic Monument in 1976.

References

Churches in Corsica
Monuments historiques of Corsica
Buildings and structures in Haute-Corse